Popo Agie may refer to:

 Popo Agie Formation, Triassic geologic formation
 Popo Agie Wilderness, located within Shoshone National Forest, Wyoming
 Popo Agie River, including:
Little Popo Agie River
Middle Fork Popo Agie River